Napoléon was a 90-gun ship of the line of the French Navy, and the first purpose-built steam battleship in the world. She is also considered the first true steam battleship, and the first screw battleship ever.

Launched in 1850, she was the lead ship of a class of nine battleships, all built over a period of ten years. This class of ship was designed by the famous naval designer Henri Dupuy de Lôme. She was originally to be named Prince de Joinville, in honour of François d'Orléans, Prince of Joinville, but was renamed 24 Février during the French Second Republic to celebrate the abdication of Louis Philippe I, and later to Napoléon in May 1850, a few days after her launch. The Prince of Joinville mentioned the incident in his Vieux Souvenirs, bitterly writing "I still laugh about it".

Technological context
Before the experimental adoption of the screw in warships in the 1840s, the only available steam technology was that of the paddle wheels, which, due to their positioning on the side of the hull and the large machinery they required were not compatible with the broadside cannon layout of the battleships.

"Dupuy de Lôme conceived and carried out the bolder scheme of designing a full-powered screw liner, and in 1847 Le Napoléon was ordered. Her success made the steam reconstruction of the fleets of the world a necessity. During the Crimean War her performances attracted great attention, and the type she represented was largely increased in numbers. In her design boldness and prudence were well combined. The good qualities of the sailing line-of-battle ships which had been secured by the genius of Sané and his colleagues were maintained; while the new conditions involved in the introduction of steam power and large coal supply were thoroughly fulfilled."

Developments by other navies
From 1844–45 the Anglo-French Entente collapsed following the French interventions in Tahiti and Morocco, and the publication of French pamphlets advocating a stronger navy (such as "Notes sur l’état des forces navales" by the Prince de Joinville), leading to an arms race in the naval area.

The Royal Navy had also commissioned a number of steam sloops,  being the first screw-propelled warship to be launched anywhere in the world in 1843. Both nations had also developed steam frigates, the French  launched in 1845, and the British  a year later. However, Napoléon was the first regular steam battleship to be launched.

In 1847, Britain had designed a screw/steam battleship named , but the project much delayed and she did not enter service until 1854. Her sister ship, was ordered in 1849 and commissioned in January 1853. Another sailing battleship, was converted to steam on the stocks and launched in March 1851; she beat Agamemnon into service in November 1852. Britain’s reluctance to commit to the steam battleship apparently stemmed from her commitment to long-distance, worldwide operation, for which, at that time, sail was still the most reliable mode of propulsion.

In the end, France and Great Britain were the only two countries to develop fleets of wooden steam battleships, although several other navies are known to have had at least one unit, built or converted with British technical support (Russia, Turkey, Sweden, Naples, Denmark and Austria). Altogether, France built 10 new wooden steam battleships and converted 28 from older battleship units, while Britain built 18 and converted 41.

References

Bibliography

 Steam, Steel and Shellfire: The Steam Warship 1815–1905, Conway’s History of the Ship,

External links
  « J’en ris encore », Nicolas Mioque

Ships built in France
1850 ships
Crimean War naval ships of France
Victorian-era ships of the line
1850 in France
Napoléon-class ships of the line